Cotton Wool is a 2017 British drama film following the story of a 7-year-old boy (Max Vento) who cares for his mother (Leanne Best) after she has survived from a stroke, with little to no help from his older sister (Katie Quinn).

The film was assisted in its research by The Stroke Association.

Cast
 Leanne Best as Rachel
 Max Vento as Sam
 Katie Quinn as Jennifer
 Kate Rutter as Marion
 Crissy Rock as Gerry
 Gemma North as Liz
 Megan Grady as Young Jennifer
 Jason Rickets as David

Reception 

The film received a 12A by the British Board of Film Classification. The film's critical reception was mixed, 'ScreenCritix' gave the film 5 stars stating "Best is a revelation", while the Mancunion criticised its short length "suffered in the rush to squeeze an 80-minute story into 40 minutes. 'UK Film Review' stated that the film was '‘Utterly enrapturing’ and
‘Affecting and heartbreaking’." At the 2017 London Film Awards, the film was awarded the 'Special Jury Award'. The film featured on BBC News, looking into the age of the director and his career, as well as the importance of supporting child carers. The films red carpet premiere took place in Oldham, Lancashire, England.

Production 
The film was shot on both digital and 35 mm film formats, using an Arriflex 435 and Red Epic. The film was shot by BAFTA winning cinematographer Alan C. McLaughlin. The production shot for 7 days in total in Barkisland, West Yorkshire.

Festivals Accolations

Awards and nominations

References

External links
 

2017 films
British drama short films
Films shot in Greater Manchester
Films shot in Yorkshire
Films set in Manchester
Films set in Yorkshire
2017 drama films
2017 independent films
2010s coming-of-age drama films
British coming-of-age drama films
British independent films
2010s English-language films
2010s British films